David Erik Aspnes (born 1 May 1939 in Madison, Wisconsin) is an American physicist and a member of the National Academy of Sciences (1998).  Aspnes developed fundamental theories of the linear and nonlinear optical properties of materials and thin films, and the technology of spectroscopic ellipsometry (SE).  SE is a metrology that is indispensable in the manufacture of integrated circuits.

Biography

Aspnes grew up on a dairy farm in the Madison area, attending a one-room country school.  Aspnes earned BS (1960) and MS (1961) degrees in Electrical Engineering at the University of Wisconsin - Madison.  Having found that a good living could be made by doing work that wasn’t dirty and dangerous, he continued his education at the University of Illinois at Urbana-Champaign, where he received a Ph.D. degree in Physics with a mathematics minor in 1965.  Aspnes spent a postdoctoral year at UIUC, where he wrote several seminal papers on the effect of electric fields on the optical properties of materials, and a second year at Brown University, where he began experimental work in the same field.  In 1967 he joined the research area of Bell Laboratories, Murray Hill, as a Member of the Technical Staff.

At Bell Laboratories Aspnes pursued his interest in the optical properties of materials and thin films, and their use not only to characterize the type of material but also its nanostructure.  Again combining theory and experiment, he developed SE as the premier method of obtaining this information.  The technology that he developed, involving both massive data acquisition and methods of analysis, became a foundation of integrated-circuit (IC) technology, where SE is essential for ensuring that process parameters are under control and that results are within specification.  Of the hundreds of processing steps used to make modern ICs, of the order of 100 of these are assessed by SE.  While ICs are the result of progress in a number of areas, it is no exaggeration to say that current capabilities in electronics, computing, communications, and data storage would not be possible without the information provided by SE.  The work also created a new field:  this year (2013) the 6th International Conference on Spectroscopic Ellipsometry will be held in Kyoto, where many papers are reporting applications of SE to biology and medicine.

When the operating companies were divested from AT&T in 1984, Aspnes moved to Bellcore, the Bell Laboratories of the operating companies, where he continued research as Head of the Interface Physics and later Interface Physics and Optical Sciences Department.  His work on the determination of the optical properties of materials during growth opened up a new field of reflectance-anisotropy spectroscopy, which allowed chemical reactions on surfaces to be followed in real time.  Research done in his department included the development of liftoff, a technology widely used for joining dissimilar materials, and photonic band structure, which has itself expanded into the new field of photonics.

In 1992 Aspnes joined the Department of Physics of North Carolina State University, where he is a Distinguished University Professor of Physics.  He is active in teaching, research, and administration both at NCSU and with external organizations.  He is Chair of Class III of the National Academy of Sciences.  He has published approximately 500 papers and holds 23 patents.  In recognition of his many contributions to science and technology he is a Fellow of various organizations and has received numerous awards, including the 1987 Wood Prize of the Optical Society of America, the 1993 John Yarwood Memorial Medal of the British Vacuum Council, the 1996 Frank Isakson Prize of the American Physical Society, the 1998 Medard W. Welch Award of the American Vacuum Society, and the 2011 Mentor Award of the Society of Vacuum Coaters.

Awards and honors
 1973 Elected Fellow of the American Physical Society
 1976 Alexander von Humboldt Senior Scientist Award
 1979 Elected Fellow Optical Society of America
 1987 Wood Prize of the Optical Society of America
 1993 John Yarwood Memorial Medal of the British Vacuum Council
 1996 Elected Fellow of the American Vacuum Society
 1996 Frank Isakson Prize for Optical Effects in Solids
 1996 Alumni Outstanding Research Award – North Carolina State University
 1996 Elected Fellow – Society of Photo-Optical Instrumentation Engineers
 1997 Max-Planck – Gesellschaft Prize for International Cooperation
 1998 Medard W. Welch Award of the American Vacuum Society
 1998 Elected Member of the National Academy of Sciences
 2002 Elected Fellow – American Association for the Advancement of Science
 2011 Mentor Award, Society of Vacuum Coaters

References

External links
 David E. Aspnes' Page at North Carolina State University
 David E. Aspnes' Biography at American Institute of Physics

1939 births
Living people
21st-century American physicists
Members of the United States National Academy of Sciences
University of Wisconsin–Madison College of Engineering alumni
Grainger College of Engineering alumni
North Carolina State University faculty